Choppington is a large village and civil parish in Northumberland, England. It is situated 5 miles to the south-east of Morpeth, and north of Bedlington. It was at one time part of the three big mid-Northumberland collieries (Ashington, Bomarsund and Choppington).

The parish, which was until 1 July 2010 called North Bedlington, was created on 1 April 2009 also includes the settlements of Bomarsund, Guide Post, Stakeford, Sheepwash, Scotland Gate and West Sleekburn.

Governance
An electoral ward exists. the population of this ward at the 2011 Census was 4,792.

References

External links

 
Villages in Northumberland
Civil parishes in Northumberland